John Parnell Thomas (January 16, 1895 – November 19, 1970) was a stockbroker and politician. He was elected to seven terms as a U.S. Representative from New Jersey as a Republican. He was later a convicted criminal who served nine months in federal prison for corruption.

Early life and career
Born as John Parnell Feeney Jr. in Jersey City, New Jersey, he changed his name in 1919 to John Parnell Thomas. Raised Catholic, he later became an Episcopalian.

After graduating from high school, he studied at the University of Pennsylvania. When the United States entered World War I in 1917, he served overseas with the United States Army. Following his discharge from the military in 1919, Thomas worked in the investment securities and insurance business in New York City for the next eighteen years.

He entered Allendale, New Jersey, municipal politics in 1925 and was elected councilman and then Mayor of Allendale, New Jersey from 1926 to 1930. He was elected to a two-year term to the New Jersey General Assembly in 1935. In 1936 Thomas was elected to the United States House of Representatives as a Republican Party Representative from New Jersey's 7th congressional district, filling the vacancy left by the death of Randolph Perkins. He would be re-elected six times.

Anti-communism
As a U.S. Congressman, Thomas was a staunch conservative opponent of President Franklin D. Roosevelt and his New Deal, claiming the President's legislative agenda had "sabotaged the capitalist system." Thomas opposed government support for the Federal Theatre Project declaring that "practically every play presented under the auspices of the Project is sheer propaganda for Communism or the New Deal."

In 1949 Thomas called the U.S. Secretary of Defense, James Forrestal, "the most dangerous man in America" and claimed that if Forrestal were not removed from office he would "cause another world war."

Demobilization
In the post-war period, Thomas called for a rapid demobilization of the American military. In 1946, he invited General Dwight Eisenhower to his office to discuss the issue. When he arrived, the general was faced with a table surrounded by soldier's wives, many holding babies. News photographers took photos of the furious Eisenhower.

HUAC
After the Republican Party gained control of the 80th Congress in the November 1946 elections, Thomas was appointed chairman of the House Committee on Un-American Activities (HUAC)–during that period, also called the "Thomas Committee." In May 1947, Thomas traveled to Hollywood to meet with film industry executives with a view to exposing what he believed was Communist infiltration of motion pictures content by members of the Screen Writers Guild. Returning to Washington, D.C., he shifted the focus of the committee to what he called the "subversives" working in the film business.

Under Thomas, in October 1947, HUAC summoned suspected Communists to appear for questioning.  These summonses led to the conviction and imprisonment for contempt of Congress of the "Hollywood Ten" who had refused to answer the Committee's questions, citing the First Amendment.

Corruption charges and imprisonment
Prominent American columnists Jack Anderson and Drew Pearson were critical of Thomas and his committee's methods.

Rumors about corrupt practices on the part of Thomas were confirmed when his secretary, Helen Campbell, sent documents to Pearson, which he used to expose Thomas' corruption in an August 4, 1948, newspaper article. The fraud had begun on New Year's Day of 1940, when Thomas placed Campbell's niece, Myra Midkiff, and Campbell's maid, Arnette Minor on his payroll as clerks. Midkiff earned roughly $1,200 a year and was to kick back her entire salary to the Congressman.  Through this practice, he would also evade a tax bracket increase. The arrangement lasted for four years. As a result, Thomas and Campbell were summoned to answer to charges of salary fraud before a grand jury.

Thomas refused to answer questions, citing his Fifth Amendment rights, the most common stance for which he had criticized accused Communists. Indicted, Thomas was tried and convicted of fraud, fined and given an 18-month prison sentence. He resigned from Congress on January 2, 1950.

In an ironic twist, he was imprisoned in Danbury Prison where Lester Cole and Ring Lardner Jr., both members of the "Hollywood Ten" were serving time because of Thomas' inquiries into the film industry.

Post-prison
After his release from prison, Thomas was an editor and publisher of three weekly newspapers in Bergen County, New Jersey. President Harry S. Truman pardoned Thomas on Christmas Eve of 1952. In 1954, Thomas tried to re-enter politics, but was defeated for the Republican Party nomination for Congress.

Death
Thomas died in 1970 in St. Petersburg, Florida, aged 75, of undisclosed causes. He was cremated, and his ashes were interred in the Elmgrove Cemetery in Mystic, Connecticut.

Depictions
In the 2015 film Trumbo, Thomas is portrayed by James Dumont.

See also

List of American federal politicians convicted of crimes
List of federal political scandals in the United States
 United States House of Representatives
 House Un-American Activities Committee
 List of members of the House Un-American Activities Committee

References

Further reading
 Caballero, Raymond. McCarthyism vs. Clinton Jencks. Norman: University of Oklahoma Press, 2019.

External links

J. Parnell Thomas' truncated bio at The Political Graveyard

|-

1895 births
1970 deaths
20th-century American lawyers
20th-century American politicians
American anti-communists
American businesspeople convicted of crimes
American politicians convicted of fraud
American stockbrokers
Converts to Anglicanism from Roman Catholicism
Mayors of places in New Jersey
Republican Party members of the New Jersey General Assembly
New Jersey lawyers
Old Right (United States)
People from Allendale, New Jersey
New Jersey politicians convicted of corruption
Politicians from Bergen County, New Jersey
Politicians from Jersey City, New Jersey
Politicians from St. Petersburg, Florida
Republican Party members of the United States House of Representatives from New Jersey
United States Army personnel of World War I